Escola Suíço-Brasileira Rio de Janeiro (ESB-RJ, "Swiss-Brazilian International School Rio de Janeiro";) is a Swiss international school in Barra da Tijuca, Rio de Janeiro. A part of the SIS Swiss International School network, it serves levels Educação Infantil until Ensino Médio (senior high school/sixth form college).

There are three bilingual divisions for students: Portuguese-English, Portuguese-German, and Portuguese-French. Students may study up to four languages, and students in the German and French divisions also study English.

Most graduates move on to attend Brazilian universities.  the tuition is 3,500 Brazilian real per month.

References

External links
 Escola Suíço-Brasileira Rio de Janeiro 
 "Der Bundesrat entzieht der Schweizerschule Rio de Janeiro die Anerkennung als Schweizerschule." Confederation of Switzerland. May 2004.

Rio de Janeiro
International schools in Rio de Janeiro (city)